Édouard-Montpetit is a Montreal Metro station in of Montreal, Quebec, Canada. It is operated by the Société de transport de Montréal (STM) and serves the Blue Line. It is located in the Côte-des-Neiges area of the borough of Côte-des-Neiges–Notre-Dame-de-Grâce near the borough of Outremont. From 2024, the station will be served by the Réseau express métropolitain (REM).

Overview 
Opened in January 1988 as part of the extension of the Blue Line to Snowdon, the station was designed by Patrice Gauthier. The station does not have artwork, however colourful benches and flooring were designed by the architect. The design of the station was constrained by a ventilation shaft for the Mont Royal Tunnel, as well as an underground aqueduct. It is a normal side platform station. 

The station was designed to be able to provide a connection with the then-Agence métropolitaine de transport's Montreal—Deux Montagnes commuter rail line, which during the planning of the original network was to have been converted into Line 3 of the Metro. This proposal did not occur, instead, the Réseau express métropolitain (REM) now takes the place of the first two proposals. 

There is an underground tunnel between the metro station and the CEPSUM complex.

In 2020, work began to install elevators to serve the Blue line platforms. This is currently planned for completion in late 2022.

Réseau express métropolitain station 
In November 2016, CDPQ Infra announced that the proposed Réseau express métropolitain (REM) system would connect to the Blue line at Édouard-Montpetit. As with the 1980s Line 3 proposal, the REM will use the historic Mont Royal tunnel to head north from downtown. 

For comparison, the Blue line is around 12 metres below ground at this location. High-speed elevators will connect the Blue line and a new entrance to the REM platforms below.

Construction on the Édouard-Montpetit REM station began in July 2018. Blasting to expand the Mont Royal tunnel to accommodate new platforms, passageways and utility rooms began in October 2018, and lasted around a year. , the REM station is planned to open at the end of 2024.

Origin of name 
During planning, the station was to be named Vincent-d'Indy, but the name was ultimately changed to Édouard-Montpetit, from the street under which it lies: Édouard-Montpetit Boulevard. The boulevard in turn takes its name from Édouard Montpetit (1881–1954), a Quebec lawyer, economist and academic closely linked with the nearby Université de Montréal.

Connecting bus routes

Nearby points of interest
 Université de Montréal:
 CEPSUM
 Marie-Victorin building, named for Marie-Victorin
 Salle Claude Champagne, named for Claude Champagne
 Académie Saint-Germain
 École de musique Vincent d'Indy

References

External links
Édouard-Montpetit station on STM website
Montreal by Metro, metrodemontreal.com
 2011 STM System Map
 Metro Map

Blue Line (Montreal Metro)
Côte-des-Neiges–Notre-Dame-de-Grâce
Railway stations in Canada opened in 1988
Réseau express métropolitain railway stations